Jackson Township is one of eighteen townships in Callaway County, Missouri, USA.  As of the 2010 census, its population was 2,150.

History
Jackson Township was created December 25, 1875 from the former northeastern sector of Liberty Township and the northwestern sector of Nine Mile Prairie Township—as one can see by comparing the 1867 and 1897 maps of Callaway County townships.  This took the city of Auxvasse, out of Liberty Township and put it in the new Jackson Township.  This is especially significant for historical and genealogical research.

Geography
It contains four cemeteries: Auxvasse, Grand Prairie, Harrison and Pleasant Grove.

The streams of Bynum Creek, Hunt Branch, Smith Branch and Yates Branch run through this township.

References

 USGS Geographic Names Information System (GNIS)

External links
 US-Counties.com
 City-Data.com
 (Callaway County 1876—see p2 for map of entire county with township boundaries) http://digital.shsmo.org/cdm/ref/collection/plat/id/6022
 (Callaway County 1930—see last page for map of entire county with township boundaries) http://cdm16795.contentdm.oclc.org/cdm/ref/collection/moplatbooks/id/656

Townships in Callaway County, Missouri
Jefferson City metropolitan area
Townships in Missouri